Pedro García (born 17 February 1963) is a Spanish handball player. He competed in the men's tournament at the 1984 Summer Olympics.

References

1963 births
Living people
Spanish male handball players
Olympic handball players of Spain
Handball players at the 1984 Summer Olympics
Sportspeople from Barcelona
20th-century Spanish people